Dietmanns is a municipality in the region Waldviertel district of Waidhofen an der Thaya in the Austrian state of Lower Austria.

Population

References

External links 

Cities and towns in Waidhofen an der Thaya District